The Nestroy Theatre Prize is an Austrian theatre award named after the poet Johann Nestroy. In 2000, the city of Vienna decided to combine two less noticed theatre awards: the Kainz Medal and the Nestroy Ring for Viennese Satire. The prize honours outstanding achievements at the Viennese and other Austrian theatres. The prize has been awarded annually in eight up to fourteen categories. Its ceremony is held in Vienna and broadcast live on national television.

Categories
 Best German-language performance
 Best direction
 Best equipment
 Best actress
 Best actor
 Best supporting role
 Best young talent
 Best off production
 Best play – Authors prize
 Lifetime achievement
 Special prize
 Audience award
 Best federal state performance

Recipients best direction

Recipients best actress

Recipients best actor

Recipients best play – authors prize

Recipients lifetime achievement

References

External links

2000 theatre awards
Awards established in 2000
Austrian theatre awards